Richard Joseph Smith (1819 – 15 November 1883) was a member of both the New South Wales Legislative Council and the Queensland Legislative Council.

Early life

Smith was born at Leicester, England in 1819 to Richard Smith and arrived in New South Wales as a young boy around 1824.  By 1845 he had travelled to Brisbane and established the Kangaroo Point Boiling Down  Works, the Marie Boiling Down Works and a Sawmill.

Politics
Smith became an elected member of the New South Wales Legislative Council on 1 March 1853, representing the Pastoral Districts of Moreton, Wide Bay, Burnett, and Maranoa. His term ended on 29 February 1856.

After Queensland had separated from New South Wales, Smith was appointed to the Queensland Legislative Council on 3 July 1863. Smith was declared insolvent in 1866 and as a consequence resigned from the Council.

Civic life 
The Governor of Queensland appointed Richard Joseph Smith to be First Lieutenant of the Cavalry of the Queensland Volunteer Rifle Corps on 26 May 1860.

After his resignation he became a crown law agent in Ipswich, before his appointment as a land commissioner in the Moreton area.

Personal life
In 1861, Smith married Maria Susanna Stutchbury in Brisbane and together they had one daughter. He died in 1883 and was buried in Ipswich General Cemetery.

References

 

1819 births
1883 deaths
Burials at Ipswich General Cemetery
English emigrants to Australia
People from Leicester
Members of the New South Wales Legislative Council
Members of the Queensland Legislative Council
19th-century Australian politicians